The Minister of Sports is a cabinet member in the Government of France.

The position has changed names a number of times since its creation, having occasionally been discontinued or regrouped with the Minister of National Education. Since 2022 Amélie Oudéa-Castéra has served Minister for Sport and the Olympic & Paralympic Games.

Officeholders

Fourth republic
Andrée Viénot (Under Secretary of State of Youth and Sports): 24 June 1946 - 22 January 1947
Pierre Bourdan (Minister of Youth Affairs and Sports): 22 January – 22 October 1947
André Morice (Secretary of State of Youth, Sports and Professional Education): 11 September 1948 – 11 August 1951
Pierre Chevalier (Secretary of State of Youth, Sports and Professional Education): 11 August – 12 August 1951
Claude Lemaître-Basset (Secretary of State of Youth, Sports and Professional Education): 12 August 1951 – 20 January 1952
Jean Masson (Secretary of State of Youth, Sports and Professional Education): 20 January 1952 – 28 June 1953
René Billères  (Minister of National Education, Youth Affairs and Sports): 1 February 1956 – 14 May 1958

Fifth republic
Maurice Herzog (High-commissar of Youth and Sports) 27 September 1958 – 8 January 1966
François Missoffe (Minister of Youth Affairs and Sports): 8 January 1966 – 30 May 1968
Roland Nungesser (Minister of Youth Affairs and Sports): 30 May – 10 July 1968
Jean-Pierre Soisson (Minister of Youth Affairs, Sports and of Leisure Activities): 5 April 1978 – 22 May 1981
André Henry (Minister of Free Time): 22 May 1981 – 22 March 1983
Alain Calmat (Minister of Youth Affairs and Sports): 23 July 1984 – 20 March 1986
Christian Bergelin (Secretary of State for Youth Affairs and Sports): 20 March 1986 – 13 May 1988
Lionel Jospin (Minister of National Education, Research and Sports): 13 May 1988 – 16 May 1991
Frédérique Bredin (Minister of Youth Affairs and Sports): 16 May 1991 – 29 March 1993
Michèle Alliot-Marie (Minister of Youth Affairs and Sports): 29 March 1993 – 18 May 1995
Guy Drut (Minister of Youth Affairs and Sports): 7 November 1995 – 4 June 1997
Marie-George Buffet (Minister of Youth Affairs and Sports): 4 June 1997 – 7 May 2002
Jean-François Lamour (Minister of Youth Affairs, Sports and Associative Life): 7 May 2002 – 18 May 2007
Roselyne Bachelot-Narquin (Minister of Youth Affairs, Sports and Health): 18 May 2007 – 14 November 2010
Chantal Jouanno (Minister of Sports): 14 November 2010 – 26 September 2011
David Douillet (Minister of Sports): 26 September 2011 – 16 May 2012
Valérie Fourneyron (Minister of Youth Affairs, Sports and Associative Life): 16 May 2012 – 31 March 2014
Najat Vallaud-Belkacem (Minister of Women's Rights, Minister of City Affairs, Minister of Youth Affairs and Sports): 2 April – 25 August 2014
Patrick Kanner (Minister of the Urbanity, Youth Affairs and Sports): 26 August 2014 – 17 May 2017
Laura Flessel (Minister of Sports): 17 May 2017 – 4 September 2018 
Roxana Maracineanu (Minister of Sports): 4 September 2018 – 6 July 2020
Roxana Maracineanu (Minister Delegate for Sport): 6 July 2020 – 20 May 2022
Amélie Oudéa-Castéra (Minister for Sport and the Olympic & Paralympic Games): 20 May 2022- incumbent

See also
 Minister Delegate (France)
 Cabinet (government)

Notes

References

Citations

Sources

External links
 Cabinet website

Youth
Sport in France
France